Gimme Gimme Gimme may refer to:

Gimme Gimme Gimme (TV series), a British comedy series
"Gimme, Gimme, Gimme" (Narada Michael Walden song)
"Gimme! Gimme! Gimme! (A Man After Midnight)", a song by ABBA
"Gimme, Gimme, Gimme", a song by Blackfoot from Tomcattin'
Gimme Gimme Gimme, an album by German Eurodance group E-Rotic
"Gimme Gimme Gimme", a song from the album
"Gimmie Gimmie Gimmie", a song by Black Flag from Damaged
A cover version of the Black Flag song by A Perfect Circle, from Emotive

See also
Gimme (disambiguation)
 Gimme Gimme (disambiguation)